The 2007 Abierto Mexicano Telcel was a tennis tournament played on outdoor clay courts. It was the 14th edition of the men's tournament (7th for the women) of the Abierto Mexicano Telcel, and was part of the International Series Gold of the 2007 ATP Tour, and of the Tier III Series of the 2007 WTA Tour. Both the men's and the women's events took place at the Fairmont Acapulco Princess in Acapulco, Mexico, from February 26 through March 3, 2007.

The men's draw was led by former World No. 1, Cincinnati Masters and Costa do Sauípe runner-up Juan Carlos Ferrero, Kitzbühel titlist and Auckland semifinalist Agustín Calleri, and Buenos Aires semifinalist Nicolás Almagro. Other seeded players were defending finalist and Costa do Sauípe semifinalist Juan Ignacio Chela, Stuttgart doubles winner Gastón Gaudio, Nicolás Massú, José Acasuso and Carlos Moyá.

In the women's field were present Tokyo and Quebec City champion Marion Bartoli, Gold Coast semifinalist and Bogotá runner-up Tathiana Garbin, and ITF Bordeaux winner Martina Müller. Other seeds were Bangkok and Quebec City semifinalist Séverine Brémond, 2005 Acapulco champion and Bogotá semifinalist Flavia Pennetta, Gisela Dulko, Sybille Bammer and Nicole Pratt.

Finals

Men's singles

 Juan Ignacio Chela defeated  Carlos Moyá, 6–3, 7–6(7–2)
It was Juan Ignacio Chela's 1st title of the year, and his 4th overall.

Women's singles

 Émilie Loit defeated  Flavia Pennetta, 7–6(7–0), 6–4
It was Émilie Loit's 1st title of the year, and her 3rd overall.

Men's doubles

 Potito Starace /  Martín Vassallo Argüello defeated  Lukáš Dlouhý /  Pavel Vízner, 6–0, 6–2

Women's doubles

 Lourdes Domínguez Lino /  Arantxa Parra Santonja defeated  Émilie Loit /  Nicole Pratt, 6–3, 6–3

References

External links
Official website
Men's Singles draw
Men's Doubles draw
Men's Qualifying Singles draw
Women's Singles, Doubles and Qualifying Singles draws

 
2007
Abierto Mexicano Telcel
Abierto Mexicano Telcel
February 2007 sports events in Mexico
March 2007 sports events in Mexico